β-Cubebene synthase (EC 4.2.3.128, cop4, Mg25) is an enzyme with systematic name (2E,6E)-farnesyl-diphosphate diphosphate-lyase (cyclizing, β-cubebene-forming). This enzyme catalyses the following chemical reaction

 (2E,6E)-farnesyl diphosphate  β-cubebene + diphosphate

Isolated from the fungus Coprinus cinereus.

References

External links 
 

EC 4.2.3